Kallikak may refer to:

The Kallikak Family, a 1912 book (fully entitled The Kallikak Family: A Study in the Heredity of Feeble-Mindedness) by the American psychologist and eugenicist Henry H. Goddard
The Kallikaks, an American television series that aired in 1977